Fiskars Group (also known as Fiskars Oyj Abp or Fiskars Corporation, and until 1998 as Fiskars Oy Ab) is a Finnish group company. The oldest business still operating in Finland, its global headquarters are in the Arabianranta district of Helsinki. It is one of the oldest companies in the world.

The company has operated in various sectors over the decades. Fiskars was formerly best known for its orange-handled scissors, which were created in 1967. More than one billion were sold by 2010. In 2019, its products related to the home, outdoor activities, interior decoration and table setting. Its key brands today include Fiskars, Iittala, Royal Copenhagen, Wedgwood and Waterford.

The Finnish marketing magazine Markkinointi & Mainonta found that Fiskars' brands are regularly among Finland's most valued brands.

History

The early stages (1649–1915)

Fiskars Corporation was formed in 1649, when a merchant named Peter Thorwöste was given a charter by Christina, Queen of Sweden, to establish a blast furnace and forging operation in the small village of Fiskars; however, he was not permitted to produce cannons. This makes it the oldest privately owned company in Finland. From the outset, the company manufactured products for consumers, industry and agriculture. The furnace produced pig iron that was shingled to wrought iron in the finery forges powered by water wheels. In the early years, Fiskars made nails, wire, hoes, and metal-reinforced wheels from wrought iron.

In the late eighteenth century, copper was discovered in nearby Orijärvi, and thus the focus of production shifted to processing copper from the Orijärvi mine. For almost 80 years, Fiskars' main source of business came from copper, but by the nineteenth century there was little copper left in Orijärvi.

In 1822, the apothecary Johan Jacob Julin (later, von Julin) from Turku acquired the Fiskars ironworks and village. During this time, the ironworks were actively developed and production focused on processing iron. In 1832, the first cutlery mill in Finland was founded in Fiskars, with the production range increasing from knives to include forks and scissors.

After Julin's death, the company became a limited liability company called Fiskars Aktiebolag in 1883. Von Julin’s youngest son, Albert von Julin, took over the management of the company.

In 1915, Fiskars was listed on the Helsinki Stock Exchange.

1916–1999

Plow production was at its peak in the 1930s, with over a million plows made. The Fiskars Kymppi plow was the most famous of these.

Fiskars made many plastic products in the 1960s, including the first ergonomic plastic-handled scissors the company is perhaps best known for. The scissors were designed by Olof Bäckström, and the first pair was manufactured in 1967. There were prototypes with handles in black, red, green and orange. After an internal vote at Fiskars, the orange color was chosen. Between 1967 and 2010, over a billion units of these orange-handled scissors were sold. The design has changed slightly over time, and in addition to orange, the scissors are manufactured in other colors as well.

In 1972, Fiskars was the first company in the world to start mass-production of left-handed ergonomic scissors, which can be identified by their red color.

In 1977, Fiskars founded a scissors factory in the United States to provide a basis for international trade and further expansion.

2000–
Fiskars Orange was officially registered as a trademark in Finland in 2003 and in the US in 2007.

Fiskars acquired Iittala Group in the summer of 2007; the value of the transaction was EUR 230 million. The brands owned by Iittala were Arabia, Hackman, BodaNova, Höganäs Keramik, Rörstrand and Høyang-Polaris. With the acquisition, Fiskars became the Nordic market leader in home products. Fiskars also acquired French Leborgne, which strengthened the company's position in the kitchenware and tabletop categories, as well as the garden tools business.

The acquisition of Royal Copenhagen A/S in 2013 complemented Fiskars' tableware offering with hand-painted porcelain. The company, founded by the Danish royalty in 1775, cost EUR 66 million. Royal Copenhagen was a leading brand in hand-painted porcelain in countries such as Japan.

In 2015, Fiskars acquired the Waterford Wedgwood group of companies (WWRD) from a US private equity investor. The acquired brands included Waterford, Wedgwood, Royal Doulton, Royal Albert and Rogaška. The transaction was worth EUR 406 million, and it more than doubled Fiskars' net sales. The number of personnel also increased by almost 50%.
In September 2015, Fiskars celebrated 100 years of being listed on the Nasdaq Helsinki Stock Exchange, along with Nokia, Wärtsilä and UPM. Fiskars recorded net sales of 1,105 million euros and an adjusted operating profit of 65.1 million euros. Cash flow from operating activities was 47.6 million euros.

In 2016, Fiskars opened the Iittala & Arabia Design Center in Helsinki, which presents the story of the brands and organizes activities. Fiskars recorded net sales of 1,204.6 million euros and an adjusted operating profit of 93.8 million euros. Cash flow from operating activities was 83.8 million euros. As Finland's oldest company, Fiskars was honored to ring the closing bell of the Nasdaq stock exchange in New York's Times Square on the last trading day of the year on Friday, December 30, 2016. The ringing celebrated Finland's 100th anniversary.

In early 2017, Fiskars Group abandoned its regional organizational structure and formed two strategic business units: Living and Functional. In addition to the English & Crystal Living business, the Scandinavian Living business was included in SBU Living. SBU Functional was formed of the Fiskars, Gerber and Gilmour brands and the Outdoor business. An exhibition was held at the Helsinki Design Museum to mark the 50th anniversary of Fiskars' orange-handled scissors. In April, 2020 Fiskars Group President and CEO Jaana Tuominen stepped down from her position with CFO Sari Pohjonen appointed interim CEO.

In 2019, Fiskars sold Leborgne. Fiskars announced that it would release a collection of gardening clothing. The Fiskars by Maria Korkeila collection will be launched at the Pitti Uomo Fashion Fair in Italy in January 2020.

Business units, brands and products
The company operates as an integrated consumer goods company. In 2019, Fiskars has two strategic business units: SBU Living and SBU Functional.

In 2018, Fiskars' key brands were Fiskars, Gerber, Iittala, Royal Copenhagen, Waterford and Wedgwood.

Fiskars’ products are available in more than 100 countries. Fiskars headquarters are located at Fiskars Campus in the Arabianranta district of Helsinki.

Living

SBU Living offers a wide range of products for tabletop, giftware and interior décor.

The business is divided into two parts:
Scandinavian Living brands include:
Arabia (homeware products; Finland)
Iittala (homeware products; Finland)
Royal Copenhagen (porcelain; Denmark)
Rörstrand (porcelain; Sweden)
 Irish and English& Crystal Living brands include:
Waterford (crystal products; Ireland)
Wedgwood (porcelain; Great Britain)
Royal Albert (porcelain; England)
Royal Doulton (homeware products; England)

Other, locally known brands owned by Fiskars in 2019 were:
Hackman (cookware, cutlery; Nordic countries)
Kitchen Devils (kitchen knives; England)
Rogaška (crystal; Slovenia)

Functional

SBU Functional creates tools for use in and around the home, for example in the garden and outdoors. The unit's brands include:
Fiskars (household goods, garden tools, craft tools)
Gerber Legendary Blades (knives and multi-function tools)
Gilmour (watering products, garden hoses, faucets and connectors)

In Finland, the garden tools are manufactured by Fiskars Brands Finland's factories in Pinjainen, near the Billnäs ironworks. The factories also manufacture other products, such as scissors and axes. The majority of product development activities are also based in Pinjainen, but there is a separate product development unit in the United States as well.

Other
Fiskars’ three primary reporting segments are Living, Functional and Other. The Other segment contains the corporate headquarters, shared services and investments; Fiskars' other business includes real estate operations. They include  of land and forests and the maintenance of several properties. The company owns areas around Fiskars Village and in Hankoniemi, among others.

Major owners

Fiskars shares are quoted on the Helsinki Stock Exchange. Among the major shareholders of the company are investment companies of the Ehrnrooth family.

Major shareholders (as of September 30, 2019):
Virala Oy Ab, 15.4%
Turret Oy Ab, 12.6%
Holdix Oy Ab, 12.4%
Bergsrådinnan Sophie von Julins Foundation, 3.1%
Oy Julius Tallberg Ab, 3.1%
Varma Mutual Pension Insurance Company, 3.0%
Gripenberg Gerda Margareta Lindsay Db, 2.4%
von Julin Sofia Margareta dödsbo, 1.9%
Ehrnrooth Jacob Robert Göran, 1.4%
Ilmarinen Mutual Pension Insurance Company, 1.4%

Social responsibility

In 2017, Fiskars celebrated Finland's centenary by donating the historically valuable Dagmar park in Källviken to Metsähallitus for a hundred years. The area includes natural forests, natural sandy beaches, cliffs, sea, and the Dagmar fountain. On the initiative of Fiskars, the area became an official nature conservation area.

In 2019, Fiskars began selling used Iittala and Arabia tableware in its own stores. Dishes unsuitable for sale are sent for recycling and reuse, for example, as material for the construction industry, as brick powder or as insulation material. Used ceramic and glass dishes by other manufacturers can also be brought to the stores for recycling.

References

External links

 
1649 establishments in Sweden
Companies established in 1649
Companies listed on Nasdaq Helsinki
Industrial design firms
Finnish brands
Garden tool manufacturers
Striking tool manufacturers
Knife manufacturing companies
Organisations based in Raseborg
Tool manufacturing companies of Finland